Lisa Schut (b. 6 July 1994) is a Dutch chess player.

Chess career 
Schut won the women's section of the Dutch Chess Championship in 2013.

She participated in the 2008 Chess Olympiad, 2010 Chess Olympiad, 2012 Chess Olympiad and the 2014 Chess Olympiad.

References

External links 
 
 
Lisa Schut chess games at 365Chess.com

1994 births
Living people
Dutch female chess players
Chess Olympiad competitors